Psyrassa is a genus of beetles in the family Cerambycidae, containing the following species:

 Psyrassa aliena (Linsley, 1934)
 Psyrassa angelicae Toledo, 2005
 Psyrassa basicornis Pascoe, 1866
 Psyrassa brevicornis Linsley, 1934
 Psyrassa castanea Bates, 1880
 Psyrassa cerina Toledo, 2005
 Psyrassa chamelae Toledo, 2005
 Psyrassa chemsaki Toledo, 2002
 Psyrassa clavigera Toledo, 2005
 Psyrassa cribricollis (Bates, 1885)
 Psyrassa cylindricollis Linsley, 1935
 Psyrassa ebenina Linsley, 1935
 Psyrassa graciliatra Toledo, 2005
 Psyrassa jaumei (Fisher, 1935)
 Psyrassa katsurae Chemsak & Noguera, 1993
 Psyrassa levicollis Chemsak & Noguera, 1993
 Psyrassa linsleyi Toledo, 2002
 Psyrassa maesi Audureau, 2010
 Psyrassa megalops Chemsak & Noguera, 1993
 Psyrassa meridionalis Martins, 2005
 Psyrassa nigricornis Bates, 1892
 Psyrassa nigripes Linsley, 1935
 Psyrassa nigroaenea Bates, 1892
 Psyrassa oaxacae Toledo, 2002
 Psyrassa pertenuis (Casey, 1924)
 Psyrassa proxima Toledo, 2005
 Psyrassa punctulata Bates, 1892
 Psyrassa rufescens Nonfried, 1894
 Psyrassa rufofemorata Linsley, 1935
 Psyrassa sallaei Bates, 1885
 Psyrassa sinaloae Linsley, 1935
 Psyrassa sthenias Bates, 1892
 Psyrassa subglabra Linsley, 1935
 Psyrassa subpicea (White, 1853)
 Psyrassa testacea Linsley, 1935
 Psyrassa tympanophora Bates, 1885
 Psyrassa unicolor (Randall, 1838)
 Psyrassa wappesi Chemsak & Noguera, 1997
 Psyrassa woodleyi Lingafelter, 2008

References

 
Elaphidiini